Patricia L. Morgan (born August 25, 1950) is an American politician and Republican member of the Rhode Island House of Representatives representing district 26 since 2021. She formerly represented district 26 from 2011 until 2019, where she chose not to run again. She became the first female minority leader of the Rhode Island House of Representatives in 2017, after she was chosen by the Republican caucus members on November 15, 2016 when former minority leader Brian Newberry stepped down from the position.

Morgan ran for Governor of Rhode Island in the 2018 election. She lost the primary to Cranston Mayor and 2014 Republican candidate Allan Fung.

On October 4, Rhode Island House Republicans voted to remove Morgan from her position as House Minority Leader following her endorsement of independent candidate Joe Trillo, a former House colleague, for Governor over Fung.

Education
Morgan attended Mississippi State University, earned her BA degree from Kent State University, her MEd from Rhode Island College, and principal's certificate from Providence College.

Controversies
Morgan complained on 28 December 2021 via Twitter that a friendship she had with an African American friend had become "hostile and unpleasant." Morgan largely attributed this hostility to efforts by teachers and the political left's support for critical race theory. Her tweet has been condemned by both Democrats and the GOP, and the BLM RI PAC, the political arm of the Black Lives Matter movement in Rhode Island, has called for her removal from committee assignments in the RI General Assembly.

Elections
2004 To challenge District 26 incumbent Representative Murphy, Morgan was unopposed for the 2004 Republican Primary, but lost to the November 2, 2004 General election to Representative Murphy.
2010 When Democratic Representative William Murphy retired and left the seat open, Morgan was unopposed for the September 23, 2010 Republican Primary, winning with 220 votes and won the November 2, 2010 General election by 90 votes with 2,239 votes (51%) against Democratic nominee Michael Senerchia.
2012 Morgan was unopposed for the September 11, 2012 Republican Primary, winning with 129 votes and won the November 6, 2012 General election with 2,849 votes (52.1%) against Democratic nominee Nicholas Denice.
2014 Morgan was unopposed for the September 9, 2014 Republican Primary, winning with 376	votes and won the November 4, 2014 General election with 2,104 votes (50.1%) against Democratic nominee Nicholas Denice who had 1,816 votes (43.2%) and Moderate Paul Caianiello, Jr. who had 275 votes (6.6%).
2016 Morgan was unopposed for the September 13, 2016 Republican Primary and won the November 8, 2016 General election with 3,192 votes (55.2%) against Democratic nominee Anthony J. Paolino who had 2,079 votes (35.9%) and Independent Vincent Marzullo who had 504 votes (8.7%).

References

External links
Official page at the Rhode Island General Assembly

Patricia Morgan at Ballotpedia
Patricia L. Morgan at the National Institute on Money in State Politics

1950 births
21st-century American politicians
21st-century American women politicians
Kent State University alumni
Living people
Republican Party members of the Rhode Island House of Representatives
Mississippi State University alumni
People from West Warwick, Rhode Island
Place of birth missing (living people)
Providence College alumni
Rhode Island College alumni
University of Rhode Island alumni
Women state legislators in Rhode Island